Nyársapát is a village in Pest County, Hungary, on the Great Hungarian Plain between the Danube and the Tisza rivers, approximately 72 km (44 mi) southeast of the Hungarian capital, Budapest.

Location 
Nyársapát is surrounded by Cegléd in the north, Nagykőrös in the south, Csemő in the west, and Törtel in the east.

References

Populated places in Pest County